Danielle Poleschuk (born 23 January 1986 in Winnipeg, Manitoba) is a Canadian freestyle skier.

She competed at the 2010 Winter Olympics in Vancouver in the women's ski cross competition and was eliminated in the 1/8 round.

Poleschuk was a Calgary resident as of early 2010.

References

External links
 Danielle Poleschuk at the 2010 Winter Olympics 
 Danielle Poleschuk main website

1986 births
Living people
Freestyle skiers at the 2010 Winter Olympics
Olympic freestyle skiers of Canada
Sportspeople from Winnipeg
Canadian female freestyle skiers